"She's on It" is a song by American rap rock group Beastie Boys. It was released on September 12, 1985, as the fifth single from of the soundtrack to the 1985 film Krush Groove. The song's guitar riff is a slightly slower version of the riff in Cheap Trick's 1978 song "Stiff Competition," which in turn was based on the riff in the Who's 1971 song "Won't Get Fooled Again." Despite failing to attract commercial success at the time of its initial release in 1985, a re-release in 1987 was more successful, becoming a top-10 hit on the UK Singles Chart and reaching the top 50 in Ireland, the Netherlands, and West Germany.

Critical reception
Cash Box said that it "makes up in rhythm what it lacks in lyrics and musicianship."

Music video
The song's video was produced by Rick Rubin and directed by producer and filmmaker Sean Travis, who later, in the 2000s, produced MTV's reality television series The Hills and The City. It was the band's first professionally produced music video and their third video overall, after 1981's Holy Snappers and Egg Raid On Mojo in 1982. Filmed in Long Beach in New York's Nassau County, the boys are trying to win the heart of a woman (Sharon Middendorf) on the beach, but their efforts are foiled by stampeding female fans. Not even the assistance of a mentor (played by Rick Rubin) can help them. Their attempts range from using Spanish Fly to flying over her in a helicopter and a net, and they even attempt to blow her up. She survives while the boys struggle to start the dynamite, and suddenly, it blows up and the video concludes. The video was included in the band's 1987 CBS/Fox Video compilation, but has not been included on any video release since.

Track listings
7-inch single (1985)
A. "She's on It" – 3:28
B. "Slow and Low" – 3:37

12-inch single (1985)
A. "She's on It" – 4:15
B. "Slow and Low" – 3:37

12-inch single (1987)
A1. "She's on It" – 4:15
B2. "Hold It, Now Hit It" – 3:30
B2. "Slow and Low" – 3:37

Charts

Release history

References

1985 singles
1985 songs
1987 singles
Beastie Boys songs
Columbia Records singles
Def Jam Recordings singles
Song recordings produced by Rick Rubin